Carl Wayne Parker (born February 5, 1965) is a former American football wide receiver in the National Football League (NFL), Canadian Football League (CFL), World League of American Football (WLAF) and Arena Football League (AFL) for the Cincinnati Bengals, Hamilton Tiger-Cats,  Sacramento Surge, Sacramento Gold Miners and the Albany Firebirds.  Parker now coaches at  Appling County High School in Baxley, Georgia.

College career
Carl Parker played college football at Vanderbilt University. Where he totaled 118 catches and 1712 yards, including 42 passes for a 19.2 YPC and 12 touchdowns as a Senior for the Commodores.

NFL career
Parker was selected in the 12th round of the 1988 NFL Draft with the 307th overall pick by the Cincinnati Bengals. Parker spent 2 seasons with Cincinnati with 1 reception for 45 yards.

From 1990 to 1992 Parker spent time in camp with the New York Jets, Pittsburgh Steelers and the Minnesota Vikings.

CFL, WLAF and AFL career

Parker signed with the Hamilton Tiger-Cats of the Canadian Football League in 1990. Playing in two games Parker caught 5 passes for 55 yards and 1 touchdown.

In 1991 the Sacramento Surge of the World League of American Football drafted him in the 4th round. Parker was Sacramento's leading receiver and Second in the League with 8 Touchdown receptions.  Parker earned All-WLAF Second-team as the league's 3rd leading receiver in both receptions (52) and in yards receiving (801). Including three 100+ yard receiving games. Parker finished the 1992 Surge season with 42 receptions, for 657 yards, 6 touchdowns and the World Bowl '92 title over the Orlando Thunder.

Parker remained with Sacramento for the 1993 season in the Canadian Football League as the Gold Miners after the WLAF ceased operations. Finishing 1993 with 46 receptions, 684 yards and 5 touchdowns.

Parker spent his last season with the Albany Firebirds of the Arena Football League.

References
  The Times Union (June 10, 2005).  "Difference Maker: Carl Parker".  The Florida Times Union. Retrieved May 25, 2015.
  Lee (August 11, 2012).  "Lee's Autograph Hall of Fame Carl Parker".   Lee's Hall of Fame. Retrieved May 25, 2015.
  The Associated Press (April 5, 1992).  "Surge Remains Unbeaten".  Tuscalooza News. Retrieved May 25, 2015.
  cflvideo1964 (April 27, 1991).  "Carl Parker Leaps for it!  29 Yards."  WLAF 1991 Season. 'Retrieved May 25, 2015.

External links
 Statistics at Just Sports Stats

1965 births
Living people
American football wide receivers
Albany Firebirds players
Cincinnati Bengals players
Hamilton Tiger-Cats players
Minnesota Vikings players
New York Jets players
Pittsburgh Steelers players
Sacramento Surge players
Vanderbilt Commodores football players
High school football coaches in Georgia (U.S. state)
Players of American football from Columbus, Georgia